L'Ermite cheese was the first cheese created at the Saint Benoit Abbey in 1943. Ermite is a blue cheese.

See also
 List of cheeses

References

Canadian cheeses
Cow's-milk cheeses